Bulbonaricus brauni (Braun's pughead pipefish) is a species of marine fish of the family Syngnathidae. It is found in the Eastern Indian Ocean, from Indonesia to Western Australia, and off the Ryukyu Islands of Japan. It lives among coral reefs at depths of 1-10m, and can grow to lengths of 5.5 cm. This species is ovoviviparous, with the males carrying eggs in a brood pouch until they hatch. The specific name honours "the collector" Mr J. Braun who brought the living holotype to the Western Australia Museum.

References

Further reading

Fishes of Australia

brauni
Marine fish
Fish described in 1978